Stjepan Stazić (born 28 September 1978) is an Austrian basketball player for BC Vienna. He plays as shooting guard and small forward.

Honours

Club 
 Italian Supercup: 1997
 FIBA Saporta Cup: 1999
 Champions of France: 2000
 Coupe de France: 2000
 FIBA Korać Cup: 2000
 Champions of Austria (2): 1997, 2003

Individual awards 
ÖBL Most Valuable Player: 2018

Notes and references

External links 

 

 

1978 births
Living people
Austrian men's basketball players
BC Zepter Vienna players
BSC Fürstenfeld Panthers players
Club Ourense Baloncesto players
KK Igokea players
Limoges CSP players
Nuova Pallacanestro Gorizia players
Olympia Larissa B.C. players
Pallacanestro Treviso players
Pallalcesto Amatori Udine players
Shooting guards
Small forwards
Basketball players from Zagreb
Traiskirchen Lions players
Viola Reggio Calabria players
Xion Dukes Klosterneuburg players